FRD-903 (also known as hexafluoropropylene oxide dimer acid, HFPO-DA, and 2,3,3,3-tetrafluoro-2-(heptafluoropropoxy)propanoic acid) is a chemical compound that is among the class of per- and polyfluoroalkyl substances (PFASs). More specifically, this synthetic petrochemical is also described as a perfluoroalkyl ether carboxylic acid (PFECA). It is not biodegradable and is not hydrolyzed by water.

Uses 
The ammonium salt of FRD-903 is FRD-902 (ammonium (2,3,3,3-tetrafluoro-2-(heptafluoropropoxy)propanoate)), which is the specific chemical which Chemours has trademarked as part of GenX process.

Drinking water 
In 2020 Michigan adopted drinking water standards for 5 previously unregulated PFAS compounds including HFPO-DA which has a maximum contaminant level (MCL) of 370 parts per trillion (ppt).

References

Perfluorinated compounds